Elachista similis is a moth in the family Elachistidae. It was described by Sugisima in 2005. It is found in Japan (Hokkaidô, Honsyû, Kyûsyû).

The length of the forewings is 3.2–3.7 mm for males and 3.4–4 mm for females. The forewings are blackish, with three silvery markings.

The larvae feed on Carex foliosissima, Carex insaniae, Carex morrowii, Carex nakiri and Luzula plumosa. They mine the leaves of their host plant. The mine is linear or elongate blotch-like. Pupation takes place in a rough cocoon, usually made between the leaves.

Etymology
The species name refers to the resemblance to Elachista gleichenella and is derived from Latin similis.

References

Moths described in 2005
similis
Moths of Japan